Mount High, also known as High Mount, High Mound, or Highmound, is an unincorporated community in Blount County, Alabama, United States, located approximately two miles west of Interstate 65 and Smoke Rise, and approximately 25 miles north of Birmingham. Mount High also is just southwest of Rickwood Caverns State Park.

References

Unincorporated communities in Blount County, Alabama
Unincorporated communities in Alabama